Kuninji is a village in the Idukki district of Kerala, India. It is located close to Thodupuzha in central Kerala. Kuninji is surrounded by seven hills.

References

External links 
 kuninji.com
 St Antonys Church Kuninji

Villages in Idukki district